Lake Macquarie State Conservation Area is a  conservation area in New South Wales Australia, approximately  from Newcastle. It is made up of six separate land sections around the coastal saltwater Lake Macquarie, covering  of the lake's foreshore. Though most of the area was declared in 1996 one section, the Morisset area, was added in January 1999.

Part of the 250 km Great North Walk passes through the conservation area. The conservation area, and adjacent Pulbah Island Nature Reserve, protect some of Lake Macquarie's little remaining natural bushland, and vegetation communities that are not present elsewhere in the state's park system.

Park sections
Chain Valley Bay
 of bushland at the lake's southern end, behind  of foreshore.

Point Wolstoncroft
This area is leased by the Department of Sport and Recreation who manage the popular Point Wolstoncroft Sport and Recreation Centre which takes up much of the southern section of the point. The centre has accommodation and sporting facilities.

Wangi Wangi Point
 of bushland on the lake's western shore with approximately of foreshore. Within this area of the park is the Wangi Point tourist park, managed by City of Lake Macquarie.

Morisset

Myuna Bay

Awaba Bay

Wangi Wangi, Awaba Bay and Morisset all have active Landcare groups where volunteers work to control invasive weeds, and encourage regenerative growth of native species.

References

External links
http://www.dsr.nsw.gov.au/pointwolstoncroft/ Point Wolstoncroft Sport and Recreation Centre

State conservation areas in New South Wales